Paraserixia is a genus of longhorn beetles of the subfamily Lamiinae, containing the following species:

 Paraserixia borneensis Breuning, 1954
 Paraserixia flava Breuning, 1965

References

Saperdini